Henry Septimus Badgery (9 December 1840 – 23 August 1917) was an Australian politician, elected as a member of the New South Wales Legislative Assembly.

Badgery was born at Sutton Forest, New South Wales, and married, in 1869, Julia, daughter of G. M. Pitt, of Sydney. He was  member for East Maitland in the Legislative Assembly of New South Wales from 5 June 1878 to 9 November 1880, and was afterwards twice elected for Monaro, serving from 2 December 1880 to 7 October  1885. Having joined the Dibbs Ministry as Secretary for Public Works, on 7 October 1885, he was defeated at Camden 12 days later and resigned office on the 31st of the same month.

Following the death of his first wife in 1894 at age 52, Badgery married a second time to Alice May King in 1896 who died late that year aged 38. He then married a third time in 1900 to Sybella Louisa,  Hooke. Badgery had six children, four sons and two daughters, in his first marriage and three children, two sons and a daughter, by his third marriage.

His brother, Frank Badgery, served in the Legislative Assembly from 1913 to 1915.

References

 

1840 births
1917 deaths
Members of the New South Wales Legislative Assembly